Illya Beloborodko, alternatively spelled as Illia Biloborodko, (born 7 May 2001) is a Ukrainian tennis player.

Beloborodko has a career high ATP singles ranking of 652 achieved on 29 August 2022. He also has a career high ATP doubles ranking of 594 achieved on 29 August 2022.

Beloborodko represents Ukraine at the Davis Cup, where he has a W/L record of 1–1.

References

External links

2001 births
Living people
Ukrainian male tennis players